Ray Flannigan (born 15 March 1949 – 24 October 2015) was an English footballer.

Playing career 
Flannigan began his career at the youth level with Margate County, and in 1965 signed as an amateur with Arsenal F.C. In 1966, he signed with Margate F.C. in the Southern League Premier Division. He made his debut on 10 October 1966 against Folkestone F.C. In 1970, he signed with Reading F.C. in the English Third Division. After two seasons with the Royals he returned to Non-League football with Ramsgate F.C. in 1972.

He later spent time with Bexley, and Gravesend & Northfleet. In 1974, he played abroad in the National Soccer League with London City, and after season in Canada he played with Cambridge City F.C. He returned to London City in 1976, and played several seasons before retiring in 1981 with Ramsgate in the Kent League. In 1982, he returned to the National Soccer League to play with Hamilton Steelers.

Personal life 
His father Jock Flannigan was a former footballer who spent time with Margate F.C. He later immigrated to Canada, and worked as a mason. He died on 25 October 2015 in London, Ontario.

References 

1949 births
2015 deaths
English footballers
Margate F.C. players
Reading F.C. players
Ramsgate F.C. players
Ebbsfleet United F.C. players
London City players
Cambridge City F.C. players
Hamilton Steelers (1981–1992) players
Canadian National Soccer League players
English Football League players
Southern Football League players
Association football defenders